Russell Hendry (born 2 March 1939) is a New Zealand former cricketer. He played 34 first-class matches for Otago between 1961 and 1974.

See also
 List of Otago representative cricketers

References

External links
 

1939 births
Living people
New Zealand cricketers
Otago cricketers
Cricketers from Dunedin